Rick Massey (born 5 June 1961) is an Australian former cricketer. He played in two first-class matches and one List A match for South Australia in 1983/84.

See also
 List of South Australian representative cricketers

References

External links
 

1961 births
Living people
Australian cricketers
South Australia cricketers
People from Tamworth, New South Wales
Cricketers from New South Wales